Cribrarula exmouthensis is a species of sea snail, a cowry, a marine gastropod mollusk in the family Cypraeidae, the cowries.

Subspecies
Cribrarula exmouthensis abrolhensis Lorenz, 2002
Cribrarula exmouthensis exmouthensis (Melvill, 1888)
Cribrarula exmouthensis magnifica Lorenz, 2002
Cribrarula exmouthensis rottnestensis Lorenz, 2002

Description

Distribution

References

 Lorenz & Hubert (2000). A guide to worldwide cowries. ConchBooks 1-584 page(s): 178

Cypraeidae